Nina Foch (April 20, 1924 – December 5, 2008) was an American actress whose career spanned over six decades. She began her career appearing in B movies for Columbia Pictures at age 19, and subsequently starred in several Broadway productions in the late 1940s and 1950s. She went on to gain widespread attention for her role as Milo Roberts in An American in Paris (1951), and gained critical notice for her role in the drama Executive Suite (1954), for which she won a National Board of Review Award and was nominated for the Academy Award for Best Supporting Actress.

Other notable roles included as Bithiah in Cecil B. DeMille's The Ten Commandments (1956), and as Helena Glabrus in Stanley Kubrick's Spartacus (1960). Beginning in the 1960s, Foch shifted her focus to teaching, and began instructing at the University of Southern California's School of Cinematic Arts, but continued to appear in numerous television series and occasional films, such as columbo prescription murder 1968 Mahogany (1975), The Great Houdini (1976), and the horror film Jennifer (1978).

Foch's later film credits include the thriller Hush, the independent comedy-drama Pumpkin (2002), and the romantic comedy How to Deal (2003). Foch made her final screen appearance in a 2007 episode of the television series The Closer, before her death in December 2008, aged 84.

Film

Television

Stage credits

Radio appearances

References

Actress filmographies
American filmographies